Backyard Science is an Australian educational children's television show based on the Dorling Kindersley book of the same name that aired from 2003 until 2007. The series was originally commissioned by Super RTL and TVOntario, and had 78 episodes produced in three seasons. Some airings split this into 156 15-minute episodes.

In this series, children experiment with everyday items in order to make something fun and practical and also provide scientific insights in a child's world.

International Distribution 
The show is broadcast in overseas markets including:
 Serbia (Nauka iz dvorišta) Ultra (TV channel)
 Canada (TVOKids)
 Croatia (Dvorište znanosti)
 Czech Republic (Věda je zábava)
 Germany (WOW - Die Entdeckerzone)
 Hungary (Da Vinci Learning)
 Indonesia (Spacetoon)
 India (Disney India, Hungama TV and National Geographic Channel)
 Israel (LOGI Channel, Titled as "Mitahat La'af" - מתחת לאף) 
 Italy (K2)
 Malaysia (Astro TVIQ)
 Pakistan (PTV)
 Poland (Da Vinci Learning)
 Romania (Da Vinci Learning)
 Russia (Da Vinci Learning)
 Turkey (Da Vinci Learning and Yumurcak TV)
 UK (Toonami and POP!) have carried the English-language episodes; a Scots Gàidhlig version, Saidheans Sporsail, hosted by Allen MacDonald and Kerry Anne MacLeod, airs on BBC Alba.
 USA (Discovery Kids, under the title Crash! Bang! Splat!)

Personalities 
The program featured Australian actress Sophie Lowe, Daniela Marie and her brother John, comedian Genevieve Fricker, and twins Lucas Hejtmanek and Priscilla Hejtmanek.

References

External links 
 abc.net.au Program Outline
 Backyard Science's channel on YouTube
 

Seven Network original programming
Australian Broadcasting Corporation original programming
Australian children's education television series
Science education television series
English-language television shows
Television series about children
Television series by Beyond Television Productions